Luiz Eduardo Azevedo Dantas  (born 24 May 1985 in Parelhas) is a Brazilian footballer, who currently plays as a forward for São José on loan from Brasil de Pelotas.

Career

Brazil
For four years in his country, Luiz Eduardo played for ABC Futebol Clube, Ceará Sporting Club, Santa Cruz Futebol Clube, Social Futebol Clube, Caldense, Volta Redonda and Londrina Esporte Clube.

Montana
In June 2009, Eduardo relocated to Bulgaria, signing a contract with PFC Montana. On 22 August 2009, he made his A Group debut in a match against Minyor Pernik. Eduardo scored a goal for the first time in Bulgaria on 17 October 2009 against Lokomotiv Plovdiv, netting twice in a 2–3 loss. In January 2010, it was reported in the Bulgaria media that he was a target for Armenian side FC Banants. He left PFC Montana at the end of 2011–12 season when his contract expired.

References

External links
Profile at jogadoresdobrasil.com

1985 births
Living people
Brazilian footballers
ABC Futebol Clube players
Esporte Clube Bahia players
Ceará Sporting Club players
Santa Cruz Futebol Clube players
FC Montana players
FC Etar 1924 Veliko Tarnovo players
Adana Demirspor footballers
Associação Atlética Caldense players
Boa Esporte Clube players
Luverdense Esporte Clube players
América Futebol Clube (RN) players
Expatriate footballers in Bulgaria
Brazilian expatriate sportspeople in Bulgaria
Expatriate footballers in Turkey
Brazilian expatriate sportspeople in Turkey
First Professional Football League (Bulgaria) players
Association football forwards